National Teen Age Republicans (TARs) is the youth wing of the United States Republican Party.

TARs have a presence in all 50 U.S. states and the District of Columbia, with membership in the tens of thousands. TARs are one of the three official youth wings of the Republican National Committee, along with Young Republican National Federation and College Republicans.

History

The oldest recorded TAR group was formed in 1960 in South Dakota.

The first national conference was held in Washington D.C. at Trinity College on June 16-21,1969, and ever since National TARs has hosted an annual Teen Age Republican Leader Conference (TLC). Following his 1980 election victory, Ronald Reagan held a reception for delegates to the TLC, where he stated that TARs "had a significant impact in the outcome of the last election...you walked the precincts, you licked stamps, stuffed envelopes, got senior citizens to the polls, and babysat while mothers voted...what you did [made] the difference between winning and losing."

Ex-TARs members include Lawrence Lessig, Paris Dennard, Frank Luntz, and Rob Bishop.

References

External links
 

Republican Party (United States) organizations
Youth wings of political parties in the United States
Political youth organizations in the United States
Conservative organizations in the United States